Protoclepsydrops is an extinct genus of early synapsids, found in Joggins, Nova Scotia. The name means 'first Clepsydrops''', and refers to it being the predecessor of the other early synapsid Clepsydrops.

Description
Like Archaeothyris, Protoclepsydrops resembled a modern lizard in superficial appearance. However, Protoclepsydrops had primitive vertebrae with tiny neural processes typical of their amniote ancestors. Protoclepsydrops is known from a few vertebrae and some humeri.

Classification
Its skeletal remains indicate that it may have been more closely related to synapsids than to sauropsids, making it a possible stem-mammal. If so, it is the oldest synapsid known, though its status is unconfirmed because its remains are too fragmentary. Protoclepsydrops lived slightly earlier than Archaeothyris.

See also

 List of pelycosaurs
 Evolution of mammals
 List of transitional fossils
 Carboniferous tetrapods
 Clepsydrops''

References

External links
 Ophiacodontids

Prehistoric synapsid genera
Carboniferous synapsids
Transitional fossils
Fossils of Canada
Fossil taxa described in 1964
Paleontology in Nova Scotia
Paleozoic life of Nova Scotia
Taxa named by Robert L. Carroll